Cannelton Cotton Mill, also known as Indiana Cotton Mill, is a National Historic Landmark of the United States located in Cannelton, Indiana, United States.  Built in 1849 as an effort to expand textile milling out of New England, it was the largest industrial building west of the Allegheny Mountains, designed by Thomas Alexander Tefft, an early industrial architect.  It was declared a National Historic Landmark in 1991.
  The building now houses residences.

History

Construction of the Cannelton Cotton Mill began in 1849 and was completed in 1851. Designed by Rhode Island architect Thomas Alexander Tefft and built of sandstone, the mill was once the largest industrial building in the United States west of the Allegheny Mountains. It initially employed about 400 workers, mostly women and girls, and annually produced more than 200,000 pounds of cotton batting and four million yards of cotton sheeting. Of 309 workers employed there in 1890, only 78 were men. As late as 1900, the mill employed 35 girls and 19 boys under the age of 18.

The driving force behind the mill's construction was Hamilton Smith (1804–1875), a prominent attorney from Louisville, Kentucky. Smith's vision was to create a western milling center to rival Lowell, Massachusetts, but using steam-powered machinery fired by locally produced coal instead of the hydropower that ran the Lowell mills. The task proved too difficult for Smith and his associates, one of whom was Salmon P. Chase, later United States Secretary of the Treasury and Chief Justice of the United States, who became Smith's friend when both were students at Dartmouth College. Another was Indiana federal judge Elisha Mills Huntington. In 1851, control of the mill passed to brothers Dwight Newcomb (1820–1892) and Horatio Dalton Newcomb (1809–1874) who operated it successfully.

The mill closed in 1954. It was listed on the National Register of Historic Places in 1975 and became a National Historic Landmark in 1991.  The adaptive restoration of the mill to a 70-unit, low-income apartment complex was completed in 2003.

Location and construction
Its most striking features are  twin towers,  one housed a fire escape and the other was used for water storage and fire protection. The mill's style is Romanesque, but it was not built as Tefft originally designed it. Tefft's drawings called for each story to have different window heads and for dormer windows in the roof. His plan also called for a stepped foundation. As built, the dormers were eliminated completely and the remaining windows, except for those in the towers, were all capped with square lintels. A half-basement with square windows replaced the stepped foundation. The overall effect is much more severe than Tefft had intended.

See also

Cotton
Cotton mill
Child labor
United States technological and industrial history

References

Thomas Alexander Tefft: American Architecture in Transition, 1845-1860: an exhibition by the Department of Art, Brown University, Providence, RI, 1988, pp. 156–157.

External links

Cannelton Cotton Mill
Historic Landmarks Foundation of Indiana: Cannelton Cotton Mill
Indiana University Lilly Library: Indiana Cotton Mills mss.
Perry County, Indiana: The Cannelton Cotton Mill

American Civil War sites
Buildings and structures in Perry County, Indiana
Historic American Engineering Record in Indiana
Industrial buildings completed in 1851
Indiana in the American Civil War
Industrial history of the United States
Industrial buildings and structures on the National Register of Historic Places in Indiana
National Historic Landmarks in Indiana
Ohio River
National Register of Historic Places in Perry County, Indiana
Child labor in the United States
Cotton mills in the United States
1851 establishments in Indiana